, is a Japanese manga series written and illustrated by Puyo. The series is a spinoff of Nagaru Tanigawa's Haruhi Suzumiya light novel series, and is based on the alternate universe originally featured in the series' fourth volume and feature film, The Disappearance of Haruhi Suzumiya. The series was serialized in Kadokawa Shoten's Young Ace magazine from July 2009 to August 2016 and is licensed by Yen Press. A 16-episode anime television series adaptation by Satelight aired between April and July 2015, with an original video animation episode released in October 2015.

Synopsis 

The setting is based on the alternate universe depicted in The Disappearance of Haruhi Suzumiya, in which Haruhi Suzumiya never formed the SOS Brigade, though there are a number of differences in both characterizations and continuity, such as Yuki Nagato being in the same class as Kyon and Ryoko Asakura. In this world, Yuki Nagato is not a stoic alien but rather a shy and tentative girl who is a member of North High's literature club alongside Ryoko Asakura, her best friend, and Kyon, whom she has a crush on. The series follows Yuki and her companions as she develops feelings for Kyon and tries to gather the courage to confess her love to him.

Publication 

The original manga by Puyo was serialized in Kadokawa Shoten's Young Ace magazine from July 4, 2009, to August 4, 2016. Kadokawa Shoten published ten tankōbon volumes from February 4, 2010, to February 4, 2017. The series is licensed in North America by Yen Press, who began releasing the series from July 24, 2012.

Media

Anime 
On December 18, 2013, which refers to a pivotal date depicted in The Disappearance of Haruhi Suzumiya, the official website for the Haruhi Suzumiya series "vanished" and was replaced by a fake error page containing a hidden link revealing that an anime adaptation of The Disappearance of Nagato Yuki-chan was in production. A year later, on December 18, 2014, the site revealed the staff and cast for the series. Unlike its predecessor, the series has been produced by Satelight rather than Kyoto Animation who produced the previous Haruhi anime with direction by Jun'ichi Wada, series composition by Touko Machida, and character design by Ikuko Ito. Additionally, the cast of The Melancholy of Haruhi Suzumiya anime series reprise their roles as the main cast. The 16-episode series aired in Japan from April 3 to July 17, 2015, and depicts events from the first five volumes of the manga. An original video animation was bundled with the manga's ninth volume on October 26, 2015.

The series has been licensed for streaming in North America by Funimation (now known as Crunchyroll), who simulcasted the subtitled version as it aired. A broadcast dub version, featuring the same cast as Bang Zoom! Entertainment's dub of the previous Haruhi series, began streaming from May 29, 2015. An acoustic version of "Arigatō, Daisuki" is used for episode 13.

Episode list

References

External links 
 

2009 manga
2015 anime OVAs
2015 anime television series debuts
2015 Japanese television series endings
Japanese adult animated comedy television series
Animated romance television series
Anime series based on manga
Anime spin-offs
Funimation
Haruhi Suzumiya
Japanese romantic comedy television series
Kadokawa Shoten manga
Kadokawa Dwango franchises
Madman Entertainment anime
Romantic comedy anime and manga
Satelight
School life in anime and manga
Seinen manga
Tokyo MX original programming
Yen Press titles